The Newport Gulls are a wooden-bat, collegiate summer baseball team based in Newport, Rhode Island. The Newport Gulls Baseball Club is a member of both the New England Collegiate Baseball League and the NECBL's Coastal  Division. Since 2001, the Gulls have played at Cardines Field.

History

An NECBL expansion team, the club was founded in Cranston in 1998. The Gulls have been one of the NECBL's most successful teams since their inception, winning six Fay Vincent, Sr. Cups as champions of the NECBL, and eleven division titles.

While most teams playing at Cardines average attendance in the dozens or, at most, a few hundred per game, the Newport Gulls, since moving to Newport in 2001, have helped bring the field back to its former glory days of the mid-twentieth century, averaging over 2,300 fans for a regular-season home game. During the 2004 season alone, the Gulls attracted over 50,000 fans through just 26 home games, with sellout crowds in excess of 3,000 people. Following the 2006 season, the Gulls set a team and league record (since surpassed) for regular season home attendance, totaling 42,424 fans after 21 games, along with the league's all-time best win–loss record of 32-10. In 15 seasons in Newport, the Gulls have never failed to win fewer than 25 regular season games.

Newport Gulls games often feature fan participation activities between innings, along with concessions, low ticket prices, and a safe atmosphere. This reputation has only added to their popularity, not only among tourists passing through Newport, but with many Aquidneck Island children and families, as well. The active crowds, historic atmosphere, and competent club management have allowed the Gulls to recruit some of the best college baseball players in the nation, with talent rivaling the Cape Cod League. Since 2001, Cardines Field has hosted the Gulls through 10 regular season division titles, 10 postseason division titles, and 6 league championships, along with other notable awards, such as the RI Governor's Cup, Pell Bridge Series Championship, and Dunkin' Donuts Cup. The Gulls have also begun an annual tradition of playing Team USA in an exhibition around Independence Day every July, in what is often a sellout game. In July 2005, the Gulls hosted the NECBL All-Star Game and Home Run Derby at Cardines, which was a major event for the park, the league, and the City of Newport. The Gulls later hosted the 2010 NECBL All-Star Game, and were scheduled to host the event a third time on July 17, 2016.

The Gulls and the NECBL as a whole have received national attention with the addition of live Internet video webcasts to the normal audio webcast of games, effectively doing so at minimum cost in infrastructure.  On opening night of the 2006 NECBL season, the Newport Gulls were the first to implement this new technology, bringing summer collegiate baseball, as well as Cardines Field, into a new era. These changes and improvements were implemented under the direction of team Director of Broadcast Operations and Media Relations Nicholas Lima from 2005-2015.

This attention is more than welcome for Gulls players, who, as amateur college athletes, hope to be drafted by Major League Baseball teams. The recent surge in recognition and popularity of the Newport Gulls organization throughout the professional baseball world has provided for an increase in the number of Gulls players to be drafted every year. The professionalism and expanse of the Gulls media operations has made it a model summer collegiate teams around the country attempt to emulate, and the Gulls internship program is considered a premier stepping stone for college students seeking a career in sports management.

The Gulls are the most successful franchise in NECBL history, having won the Fay Vincent Sr. Cup in 2001, 2002, 2005, 2009, 2012, and most recently in 2014.  The 2012 Gulls were Perfect Games unofficial national champion, and NECBL's first team to be so honored.

Attendance
The following is a list of Gulls attendance figures at Cardines Field dating back to the 2001 season, when the team began using the facility.

Postseason appearances

Notable players

Notable games
July 29, 2002:  Rafael Lara plays all nine positions in a nine-inning game against the Mill City All-Americans. On the pitcher's mound for the seventh inning, Lara got credit for the Gulls 5-4 win.
July 1, 2005:  Four Gulls pitchers throw a no-hitter.  After a first-batter walk, the next 27 Danbury Westerner batters are retired in order.
August 8, 2005: Gulls' second baseman Jeff Miller turns an unassisted triple play in a NECBL championship series game.
July 21, 2006: Three Gulls pitchers throw a no-hitter against the North Adams SteepleCats.
July 4, 2008: Gulls pitcher Chase Reid strikes out an NECBL-record 19 Torrington Twisters.

Notes

References

External links
 Official site of the Newport Gulls

New England Collegiate Baseball League teams
Newport County, Rhode Island
Amateur baseball teams in Rhode Island
College sports teams in Rhode Island
1998 establishments in Rhode Island
Baseball teams established in 1998